Flag of convenience (FOC) is a business practice whereby a ship's owners register a merchant ship in a ship register of a country other than that of the ship's owners, and the ship flies the civil ensign of that country, called the flag state. The term is often used pejoratively, and although common, the practice is sometimes regarded as contentious. 

Each merchant ship is required by international law to be registered in a registry created by a country, and a ship is subject to the laws of that country, which are used also if the ship is involved in a case under admiralty law. A ship's owners may elect to register a ship in a foreign country so as to avoid the regulations of the owners' country, which may, for example, have stricter safety standards. They may also select a jurisdiction to reduce operating costs, avoiding higher taxes in the owners' country and bypassing laws that protect the wages and working conditions of mariners. The term "flag of convenience" has been used since the 1950s. A registry which does not have a nationality or residency requirement for ship registration is often described as an open registry. Panama, for example, offers advantages such as easier registration (often online), the ability to employ cheaper foreign labour, and an exemption on income taxes.

The modern practice of ships being registered in a foreign country began in the 1920s in the United States when shipowners seeking to serve alcohol to passengers during Prohibition registered their ships in Panama. Owners soon began to perceive advantages in terms of avoiding increased regulations and rising labor costs and continued to register their ships in Panama even after Prohibition ended. The use of open registries steadily increased, and in 1968, Liberia grew to surpass the United Kingdom with the world's largest ship register. 

, more than half the world's merchant ships were registered with open registries, and almost 40% of the entire world fleet, in terms of deadweight tonnage, (DWT) were registered in Panama, Liberia, and the Marshall Islands. It is estimated that nearly two thirds of the world's fleet is registered in states to which they had no connection. According to the UN Conference on Trade and Development (UNCTAD), in January 2021, Panama had 6,653 ships on its registry (16 percent of the global fleet by DWT), followed by Liberia (3,909), Marshall Islands (3,732), Singapore (2,541), and Hong Kong (2,440).

Background
Open registries have been criticised, mainly by trade union organisations based in developed countries, especially those in the European Union, United States, Japan, Canada, or the United Kingdom. One criticism is that shipowners who want to hide their ownership may select a flag-of-convenience jurisdiction which enables them to be legally anonymous. Some ships with flags of convenience have been found engaging in crime, offering substandard working conditions, and negatively impacting the environment, primarily through illegal, unreported and unregulated fishing. Prior to the implementation of the International Convention on Tonnage Measurement of Ships, 1969, shipowners may have selected a jurisdiction with measurement rules that reduced the certified gross register tonnage of a ship, to reduce subsequent port of call dock dues. Such was a consideration when Carnival Cruise Line changed the flag of the RMS Empress of Canada in 1972 to that of Panama. In 2011, Cunard Line registered all its ships in Bermuda, which, besides other considerations, enabled its ship captains to marry couples at sea. Weddings at sea are described as a lucrative market.

, thirteen flag states have been found by international shipping organisations to have substandard regulations. On the other hand, maritime industry practitioners and seafarers from other countries contend that this is a natural product of globalisation. Supporters of the practice, however, point to economic and regulatory advantages, and increased freedom in choosing employees from an international labour pool. Publications from as early as 1962 argue that shipowners from developed countries use the practice to be competitive in a global environment.

Legal context
International law requires that every merchant ship be registered in a country. The country in which a ship is registered is its flag state, and the flag state gives the ship the right to fly its civil ensign. A ship operates under the laws of its flag state, and these laws are used if the ship is involved in an admiralty case. A ship's flag state exercises regulatory control over the vessel and is required to inspect it regularly, certify the ship's equipment and crew, and issue safety and pollution prevention documents. The organization which actually registers the ship is known as its registry. Registries may be governmental or private agencies.

Reasons for adopting a flag of convenience
The reasons for choosing an open register are varied and include tax avoidance, the ability to avoid national labor and environmental regulations, and the ability to hire crews from lower-wage countries. National or closed registries typically require a ship be owned and constructed by national interests, and at least partially crewed by its citizens. Conversely, open registries frequently offer on-line registration with few questions asked. The use of flags of convenience lowers registration and maintenance costs, which in turn reduces overall transportation costs. The accumulated advantages can be significant, for example in 1999, 28 of the American company SeaLand's fleet of 63 ships were foreign-flagged, saving the company up to US$3.5 million per ship every year.

Accidents and reform

Resulting from strong political and public outcry over the Amoco Cadiz sinking, fourteen European nations signed the 1982 Paris Memorandum of Understanding on Port State Control or Paris MOU. Under port state control, ships in international trade became subject to inspection by the states they visit. In addition to shipboard living and working conditions, these inspections cover items concerning the safety of life at sea and the prevention of pollution by ships. In cases when a port state inspection uncovers problems with a ship, the port state may take actions including detaining the ship. In 2015, member states of the Paris MOU conducted 17,858 inspections with deficiencies, which resulted in 595 detained vessels and 11 banned. Member states of the Tokyo Memorandum of Understanding conducted 17,269 ship inspections in 2015, recording 83,606 deficiencies which resulted in 1,153 detentions.

The principle that there be a genuine link between a ship's owners and its flag state dates back to 1958, when Article 5(1) of the Geneva Convention on the High Seas also required that "the state must effectively exercise its jurisdiction and control in administrative, technical and social matters over ships flying its flag." The principle was repeated in Article 91 of the 1982 treaty called the United Nations Convention on the Law of the Sea and often referred to as UNCLOS. In 1986, the United Nations Conference on Trade and Development attempted to solidify the genuine link concept in the United Nations Convention on Conditions for Registration of Ships. The Convention for Registration of Ships would require that a flag state be linked to its ships either by having an economic stake in the ownership of its ships or by providing mariners to crew the ships. To come into force, the 1986 treaty requires 40 signatories whose combined tonnage exceeds 25% of the world total. , only 14 countries have signed the treaty.

History
Merchant ships have used false flags as a tactic to evade enemy warships since antiquity, and examples can be found from as early as the Roman era through to the Middle Ages. Following the American Revolutionary War, merchantmen flying the flag of the fledgling United States quickly found it offered little protection against attack by Barbary pirates – many responded by seeking to transfer their registry back to Great Britain. The use of false flags was frequently used as a ruse de guerre by the British during the Napoleonic Wars and the United States during the War of 1812. During the mid-19th century, slave ships flew various flags to avoid being searched by British anti-slavery fleets. The Belen Quezada, in August 1919, was the first foreign ship to be re-registered in the Panamanian registry, and was employed in running illegal alcohol between Canada and the United States during Prohibition. The modern practice of registering ships in foreign countries to gain economic advantage originated in the United States in the era of World War I, though the term "flag of convenience" did not come into use until the 1950s.

Between 1915 and 1922, several laws were passed in the United States to strengthen the United States Merchant Marine and provide safeguards for its mariners. During this period, U.S.-flagged ships became subject to regular inspections undertaken by the American Bureau of Shipping. This was also the time of Robert LaFollette's Seamen's Act of 1915, which has been described as the "Magna Carta of American sailors' rights". The Seamen's Act regulated mariners' working hours, their payment, and established baseline requirements for shipboard food. It also reduced penalties for disobedience and abolished the practice of imprisoning sailors for the offense of desertion. Another aspect of the Seamen's Act was enforcement of safety standards, with requirements on lifeboats, the number of qualified able seamen on board, and that officers and seamen be able to speak the same language. These laws put U.S.-flagged vessels at an economic disadvantage against countries lacking such safeguards, and ships started to be re-registered in Panama's open registry from 1919. In addition to sidestepping the Seamen's Act, Panamanian-flagged ships in this early period paid sailors on the Japanese wage scale, which was much lower than that of western merchant powers. In the early phase of World War II the transfer of American-owned ships to the Panama registry was sanctioned by the United States government so that they could be used to deliver materials to Britain without dragging the United States, as a neutral, unintentionally into war.

The Liberian open registry, founded in 1948, was the brainchild of Edward Stettinius, who had been Franklin D. Roosevelt's Secretary of State during World War II. Stettinius created a corporate structure that included The Liberia Corporation, a joint-venture with the government of Liberia. The corporation was structured so that 25% of its revenue would go to the Liberian government, another 10% went to fund social programs in Liberia, and the remainder returned to Stettinius' corporation. The Liberian registry was created at a time when Panama's registry was becoming less attractive for several reasons including its unpopularity with the U.S. labor movement and European shipping concerns, political unrest in Panama, and increases in its fees and regulations.

On 11 March 1949, Greek shipping magnate Stavros Niarchos registered the first ship under the Liberian flag, World Peace. When Stettinius died in 1949, ownership of the registry passed to the International Bank of Washington, led by General George Olmsted. Within 18 years, Liberia grew to surpass the United Kingdom as the world's largest register.

Due to Liberia's 1989 and 1999 civil wars, its registry eventually fell second to Panama's flag of convenience, but maritime funds continued to supply 70% of its total government revenue. After the civil war of 1990, Liberia joined with the Republic of the Marshall Islands to develop a new maritime and corporate program. The resulting company, International Registries, was formed as a parent company, and in 1993 was bought out by its management. After taking over the Liberian government, Americo-Liberian warlord Charles Taylor signed a new registry contract with the Liberian International Ship and Corporate Registry, commonly known as LISCR. LISCR was one of the few legal sources of income for Taylor's regime. Liberia's registry is operated from Virginia, United States.

, the open registries of Panama, Liberia, and Marshall Islands accounted for almost 40% of the entire world fleet by deadweight tonnage, maintaining roughly the same proportion for over a decade. In 2009, the top ten flags of convenience registered 55% of the world's deadweight tonnage, including 61% of bulk carriers and 56% of oil tankers; by 2021, they accounted for 38% of the world's vessels and over two-thirds of the global deadweight tonnage.

To counteract class hopping, in 2009 the International Association of Classification Societies (IACS) established a Transfer of Class Agreement (TOCA).

Extent of use

The International Transport Workers' Federation (ITF) maintains a list of registries it considers to be flags of convenience (FOC) registries. In developing the list, the ITF considers "ability and willingness of the flag state to enforce international minimum social standards on its vessels," the "degree of ratification and enforcement of ILO Conventions and Recommendations," and "safety and environmental record". , the list includes 42 countries.

, Panama, Liberia and the Marshall Islands are the world's three largest registries in terms of deadweight tonnage (DWT). Panama dominates the scene with over 8,065 ships accounting for almost 23% of the world's DWT. Of the three, the Marshall Islands (with 1,265 registered ships) had the greatest rate of DWT increase in 2009, increasing its tonnage by almost 15%.

The Bahamian flag ranks sixth worldwide, behind the Hong Kong and Greek registries, but is similar in size to the Marshallese flag of convenience, with about 200 more ships but a carrying capacity about  lower.

At the eleventh position, Cyprus registered 1,016 ships in 2009, 2.6% of world tonnage. The remaining top 11 flags of convenience are Antigua and Barbuda (#20), Bermuda (#22), Saint Vincent and the Grenadines (#26), and the French International Ship Register (FIS) at number No. 27.

The remaining flags of convenience listed by the ITF each account for less than 1% of the world's DWT. , more than half of the world's merchant ships (measured by tonnage) are registered under flags of convenience.

Criticism
There are a number of common threads found in criticisms of the flag of convenience system. One is that these flag states have insufficient regulations and that those regulations they do have are poorly enforced. Another is that, in many cases, the flag state cannot identify a shipowner, much less hold the owner civilly or criminally responsible for a ship's actions. As a result of this lack of flag state control, flags of convenience are criticized on grounds of enabling tax avoidance, providing an environment for conducting criminal activities, supporting terrorism, providing poor working conditions for seafarers, and having an adverse effect on the environment.

David Cockroft, former general secretary of the ITF says:

Panama has the largest maritime register, followed by Liberia. Landlocked Bolivia also has a major registry, as does Mongolia. Also, some registers are based in other countries. For example, Panamanian overseas consulates manage the documentation and collect registration fees, Liberia's registry is managed by a company in Virginia and Bahamas' from the City of London.

Concealed ownership
A ship's beneficial owner is legally and financially responsible for the ship and its activities. For any of a number of reasons, some justifiable and some suspicious, shipowners who wish to conceal their ownership may use a number of strategies to achieve that goal.

In jurisdictions that permit it, actual owners may establish shell corporations to be the legal owners of their ships, making it difficult, if not impossible, to track who is the beneficial owner of the ship. The 2004 Report of the UN Secretary General's Consultative Group on Flag State Implementation reported that "It is very easy, and comparatively inexpensive, to establish a complex web of corporate entities to provide very effective cover to the identities of beneficial owners who do not want to be known."

According to a 2003 report by the Organisation for Economic Co-operation and Development (OECD) report entitled "Ownership and Control of Ships", these corporate structures are often multi-layered, spread across numerous jurisdictions, and make the beneficial owner "almost impenetrable" to law enforcement officials and taxation. The report concludes that "regardless of the reasons why the cloak of anonymity is made available, if it is provided it will also assist those who may wish to remain hidden because they engage in illegal or criminal activities, including terrorists." The OECD report concludes that the use of bearer shares is "perhaps the single most important (and perhaps the most widely used) mechanism" to protect the anonymity of a ship's beneficial owner. Physically possessing a bearer share accords ownership of the corporation. There is no requirement for reporting the transfer of bearer shares, and not every jurisdiction requires that their serial numbers even be recorded.

Two similar techniques to provide anonymity for a ship's beneficial owner are "nominee shareholders" and "nominee directors". In some jurisdictions that require shareholder identities to be reported, a loophole may exist where the beneficial owner may appoint a nominee to be the shareholder, and that nominee cannot legally be compelled to reveal the identity of the beneficial owner. All corporations are required to have at least one director, however many jurisdictions allow this to be a nominee director. A nominee director's name would appear on all corporate paperwork in place of the beneficial owners, and like nominee shareholders, few jurisdictions can compel a nominee director to divulge the identity of beneficial owners. A further hurdle is that some jurisdictions allow a corporation to be named as a director.

Crime
Flag of convenience ships have long been linked to crime on the high seas. For example, in 1982, Honduras shut down its open registry operations because it had enabled "illegal traffic of all kinds and had given Honduras a bad name".

Ships registered by the Cambodia Shipping Corporation (CSC) were found smuggling drugs and cigarettes in Europe, breaking the Iraq oil embargo, and engaging in human trafficking and prostitution in Europe and Asia. In response to these activities, in 2000, Ahamd Yahya of the Cambodian Ministry of Public Works and Transport told industry publication Fairplay "We don't know or care who owns the ships or whether they're doing 'white' or 'black' business ... it is not our concern." Less than two years later, French forces seized the Cambodian-flagged, Greek-owned MV Winner for cocaine smuggling. Shortly after the seizure, Cambodian Prime Minister Hun Sen closed the registry to foreign ships, and Cambodia canceled its contract with CSC shortly thereafter.

The North Korean flag of convenience has also garnered significant scrutiny. In 2003, the North Korean freighter Pong Su reflagged to Tuvalu in the middle of a voyage shortly before being seized by Australian authorities for smuggling heroin into that country. That year, thirteen nations began monitoring vessels under the North Korean flag for "illicit cargos like drugs, missiles or nuclear weapon fuel".

Working conditions
In the accompanying material of the ILO's Maritime Labour Convention of 2006, the International Labour Organization estimated that at that time there were approximately 1,200,000 working seafarers across the world. This document goes on to say that when working aboard ships flagged to states that do not "exercise effective jurisdiction and control" over their ships that "seafarers often have to work under unacceptable conditions, to the detriment of their well-being, health and safety and the safety of the ships on which they work."

The International Transport Workers' Federation goes further, stating that flags of convenience "provide a means of avoiding labor regulation in the country of ownership, and become a vehicle for paying low wages and forcing long hours of work and unsafe working conditions. Since FOC ships have no real nationality, they are beyond the reach of any single national seafarers' trade union." They also say that these ships have low safety standards and no construction requirements, that they "do not enforce safety standards, minimum social standards or trade union rights for seafarers", that they frequently fail to pay their crews, have poor safety records, and engage in practices such as abandoning crewmen in distant ports.

Environmental effects
While flag of convenience ships have been involved with some of the highest-profile oil spills in history (such as the Maltese-flagged , the Bahamian-flagged , the Marshallese-flagged Deepwater Horizon, and the Liberian-flagged ,  and ), the most common environmental criticism they face regards illegal fishing. These critics of the flag of convenience system argue that many of the FOC flag states lack the resources or the will to properly monitor and control those vessels. The Environmental Justice Foundation (EJF) contends that illegal, unreported and unregulated fishing (IUU) vessels use flags of convenience to avoid fisheries regulations and controls. Flags of convenience help reduce the operating costs associated with illegal fishing methods, and help illegal operators avoid prosecution and hide beneficial ownership. As a result, flags of convenience perpetuate IUU fishing which has extensive environmental, social and economic impacts, particularly in developing countries. The EJF is campaigning to end the granting of flags of convenience to fishing vessels as an effective measure to combat IUU fishing.

According to Franz Fischler, European Union Fisheries Commissioner,

Port state control

In 1978, a number of European countries agreed in The Hague to audit labour conditions on board vessels vis-a-vis the rules of the International Labour Organization. To this end, in 1982 the "Paris Memorandum of Understanding on Port State Control" (Paris MOU) was established, setting port state control standards for what is now twenty-six European countries and Canada.

Several other regional Memoranda of Understanding have been established based on the Paris model, including the "Memorandum of Understanding on Port State Control in the Asia-Pacific Region", typically referred to as the "Tokyo MOU", and organizations for the Black Sea, the Caribbean, the Indian Ocean, the Mediterranean, and Latin America. The Tokyo and Paris organizations generate, based on deficiencies and detentions, black-, white-, and grey-lists of flag states. The US Coast Guard, which handles port state control inspections in the US, maintains a similar target list for underperforming flag states. , at least nine of the 42 flags of convenience listed by the ITF are targeted for special enforcement by the countries of the Paris and Tokyo MOUs or U.S. Coast Guard.

The effectiveness of the port state control regime in correcting deficiencies is mitigated in some part by the practice of flag-hopping, in which shipowners and operators will rename their ships and acquire new vessel registrations in other jurisdictions in order to avoid detection and reduce the likelihood of being selected for port state control inspections.

Ratification of maritime conventions

International regulations for the maritime industry are promulgated by agencies of the United Nations, particularly the International Maritime Organization and International Labour Organization. Flag states adopt these regulations for their ships by ratifying individual treaties. One common criticism against flag of convenience countries is that they allow shipowners to avoid these regulations by not ratifying important treaties or by failing to enforce them.

The International Chamber of Shipping (ICS) issues an annual report entitled the Shipping Industry Flag State Performance Table identifying the six "core" conventions representing a minimum level of maritime regulation, from the viewpoint of shipowners, as SOLAS, MARPOL, LL 66, STCW, MLC, and CLC/FUND92. Of these, all 42 flag of convenience countries listed by ITF have ratified the STCW Convention, concerning standards of training, certification and watchkeeping for seafarers, and 22 of them have ratified all six. However, at least seventeen listed countries have not ratified all the remaining five conventions. To put this in context, over 50 flag states have not ratified all six conventions, including China and United States of America.

The Safety of Life at Sea (SOLAS) and Load Line (LL 66) conventions focus on shipboard safety issues. Originally developed in response to the sinking of RMS Titanic, SOLAS sets regulations on lifeboats, emergency equipment and safety procedures, including continuous radio watches. It has been updated to include regulations on ship construction, fire protection systems, life-saving appliances, radio communications, safety of navigation, management for the safe operation of ships, and other safety and security concerns. LL 66 sets standards for minimum buoyancy, hull stress, and ship's fittings, as well as establishing navigational zones where extra precautions must be taken.

The International Labour Organization Maritime Labour Convention, 2006 provides comprehensive rights and protection at work for seafarers, including requirements for minimum age, qualifications, hours of work and rest, medical care, complaint procedures, wage payments, and onboard living arrangements. The MLC replaced a number of earlier ILO Conventions including ILO147.

MARPOL and CLC/FUND92 relate to pollution. The International Convention for the Prevention of Pollution from Ships, 1973 (MARPOL), as modified by the Protocol of 1978, including Annexes I–VI" regulates pollution by ships, including oil and air pollution, shipboard sewage and garbage. The Civil Liability for Oil Pollution Damage (CLC) and International Fund for Compensation for Oil Pollution Damage (FUND92) together provide mechanisms to ensure compensation for victims of oil spills.

Wages
The United Nations Conference on Trade and Development, in its 2009 Report on Maritime Trade, states that shipowners often register their ships under a foreign flag in order to employ "seafarers from developing countries with lower wages". The Philippines and China supply a large percentage of maritime labor in general, and major flags of convenience in particular. In 2009, the flag-states employing the highest number of expatriate-Filipino seafarers were Panama, the Bahamas, Liberia and the Marshall Islands. That year, more than 150,000 Filipino sailors were employed by these four flags of convenience. In a 2006 study by the United States Maritime Administration (MARAD), sailors from the People's Republic of China comprised over 40% of the crews on surveyed ships flying the Panamanian flag, and around 10% of those flying the Liberian flag. The MARAD report referred to both China and the Philippines as "low cost" crewing sources.

The seafaring industry is often divided into two employment groups: licensed mariners including deck officers and marine engineers, and mariners that are not required to have licenses, such as able seamen and cooks, but are required to be certified. The latter group is collectively known as unlicensed mariners or ratings. Differences in wages can be seen in both groups, between "high cost" crewing sources such as the United States, and "low cost" sources such as China and The Philippines. However, salaries on flag of convenience ships are still far higher than median salaries of non-seafarers in these countries, in addition to income tax exemption of some seamen, particularly those from the Philippines.

For unlicensed mariners, 2009 statistics from the American Bureau of Labor Statistics give median earnings for able and ordinary seamen as US$35,810, varying from $21,640 (at the 10th percentile) to $55,360 (at the 90th percentile). This can be compared with 2006 statistics from the International Labour Organization, giving average yearly earnings for Filipino and Chinese able seamen around $2,000 to $3,000 per year (PHP9,900 per month and CNY3,071 per year). Among licensed mariners, American chief engineers earned a median $63,630, varying from $35,030 to $109,310 while their Filipino counterparts averaged $5,500 per year (PHP21,342 per month).

See also 
Declaration recognising the Right to a Flag of States having no Sea-coast
Tax haven

Footnotes

References

News stories

Fishing references

Port state control organisations

Further reading

 
 
 
Carlisle, Rodney. (1981). Sovereignty for Sale: The Origin and Evolution of the Panamanian and Liberian Flags of Convenience. Annapolis, MD: Naval Institute Press. 
Carlisle, Rodney. (2009). Second Registers: Maritime Nations Respond to Flags of Convenience, 1984–1998. The Northern Mariner, 19:3, 319–340.

External links

Database on reported incidents of abandonment of seafarers
Flag of Convenience Cyprus: Prestige Oil Spill 
List of flag State comments on detentions for the years 2000, 2001 and 2002

1920s establishments in the United States
1950s neologisms
Business terms
Flag practices
International taxation
International trade
Law of the sea
Offshore finance
Offshoring
Ship registration
Flag of convenience
Illegal, unreported and unregulated fishing